Anambra State House of Assembly is the Legislative Branch of the Anambra State Government created in 1991 when Anambra State was created. It is a unicameral body with 30 elected members who represent 30 Constituencies.  Hon. Uchenna Okafor is the current Speaker of the Anambra State House of Assembly. Recently on 25th February, 2022, the Anambra State House of Assembly appointed a new Chief Whip, Dr Pete Ibida, who is representing Njikoka ll constituency.

Composition of Anambra State House of Assembly 

The Anambra State House of Assembly has 30 members. These members represent the 30 constituencies that are under the 21 local government areas of the state. The local government areas are divided into three senatorial zones which comprised Anambra Central, Anambra North, and Anambra South. These Senatorial zones comprised 10 constituencies each that have representatives in the State House of Assembly.

List of constituencies in Anambra State House of Assembly 
Anambra Central Senatorial Zone: Anaocha I, Anaocha II, Awka North, Awka South I, Awka South II, Dunukofia, Idemmili North, Idemmili South, Njikoka I and Njikoka II. 

Anambra North Senatorial Zone: Anambra West, Anambra East, Oyi, Onitsha North II, 

Onitsha South I, Onitsha South II, Ayamelum, Onitsha North I, Ogbaru I and Ogbaru II. 

Anambra South Senatorial Zone: Aguata I, Aguata II, Ihiala I, Ihiala II, Nnewi North, 

Nnewi South I, Orumba North, Orumba South, Ekwusigo and Nnewi South II

Defections in Anambra State House of Assembly 
The Anambra State House of Assembly has witnessed a series of defections. In September 2021, 

six lawmakers defected from All Progressives Grand Alliance (APGA) to All Progressives Congress (APC). 

In the same vein, 11 members of the House moved from the All Progressives Grand Alliance (APGA) and 

the Peoples Democratic Party (PDP) into the All Progressives Congress (APC). The defectors were five 

serving members, four former House of Representatives members, and two Anambra House of Assembly 

members. They were Douglas Egbuna, Ebuchi Offor, Vincent Oguwelu, Ifeanyichukwu Ibezi, Emeka Anoku, 

Chris Emeka and Ifeanyi Monah. They also included Ohwudili Ezenwa, Chinwe Nwaebili,.Chuma Nzeribe 

and Emeka Azubogu.

References

Politics of Anambra State
1991 establishments in Nigeria